Highway 6 is an Iraqi highway which extends from Baghdad to Basrah.  It passes through Al Kut and Al Amarah.

Roads in Iraq